Tony Green is a British TV presenter.

Tony Green may also refer to:
Tony Green (American football) (born 1956), former American football running back
Tony Green (athletics official), current president of Athletics Papua New Guinea
Tony Green (footballer) (born 1946), Scottish former footballer

See also
Anthony Green (disambiguation)
Antonio Marcel Green, also known as Tony Green, New Zealand rally and drift car driver
Tony Greene (born 1949), American football safety for the Buffalo Bills
Tony Greene (artist) (1955–1990), American visual artist